A parity progression ratios (PPR) is a measure commonly used in demography to study fertility.  The PPR is simply the proportion of women with a certain number of children who go on to have another child.  

In more developed countries where two-child families are seen as the norm  (or the proportion of women with two children who go on to have a third) is of critical importance in determining overall fertility levels.

 is simply the proportion of women who become mothers.

References 

Human pregnancy